Baltic Freedom Day – 14 June, a name given to the day when Soviet deportations from the Baltic states started. The term Baltic Freedom Day for the first time was mentioned in Ronald Reagan's proclamation number 4948 on June 14, 1982.

Baltic Freedom Day references the Soviet-Nazi Molotov–Ribbentrop Pact which led to the mass deportations of peoples from Estonia, Latvia, and Lithuania.

References 

History of the Baltic states
Soviet Union–United States relations
Observances in the United States
June observances